Robert Vaughan "Bobby" Sheehan (June 12, 1968 – August 20, 1999) was an American musician and songwriter best known as a founding member and bassist of Blues Traveler.

Life and Death
Sheehan attended the Berklee College of Music and co-founded Blues Traveler in 1987. Sheehan had his own group of fans called FOB (Front of Bob) who would always meet in front of him during live shows. FOB is also an abbreviation for "front of board", in reference to live concert recording by audience members, which Blues Traveler encouraged. 

He died of an accidental overdose of heroin, cocaine, and valium in 1999.

References

External links
 

1968 births
1999 deaths
American rock bass guitarists
Musicians from Summit, New Jersey
Cocaine-related deaths in Louisiana
20th-century American bass guitarists
Grammy Award winners
Guitarists from New Jersey
American male bass guitarists
20th-century American male musicians
Berklee College of Music alumni
Deaths by heroin overdose in the United States
Blues Traveler members